

Men

Road race

Time trial

Women

References

 

National road cycling championships
Cycle races in Tunisia